Kolavalvil Ramar Temple is a Hindu temple dedicated to Vishnu located 19 km away from Kumbakonam, Tamil Nadu, India on the Kumbakonam-Chennai highway in the South Indian state of Tamil Nadu. Constructed in the Dravidian style of architecture, the temple is glorified in the Nalayira Divya Prabandham, the early medieval Tamil canon of the Alvar saints from the 6th–9th centuries CE. It is one of the 108 Divya Desams dedicated to Vishnu, who is worshipped as Kola Valvill Ramar and his consort Lakshmi as Maragathavalli.

The temple is believed to have been built by the Medieval Cholas, with later expansions from Vijayanagara kings. A granite wall surrounds the temple, enclosing all the shrines and two bodies of water. There is a four-tiered rajagopuram, the temple's gateway tower, in the temple.

Kola Vallvil Ramar is believed to have appeared to sage Markendeya. Six daily rituals and three yearly festivals are held at the temple. The temple is maintained and administered by the Hindu Religious and Endowment Board of the Government of Tamil Nadu.

Legend

As per Hindu legend, the temple was called Brahma Putram in Satya Yuga, Parasaram in Treta Yuga, Sainthiranagaram in Dvapara Yuga and Bhargavapuram in Kali Yuga. The temple is associated with Trivikrama avatar of Vishnu. As per the legend, Sukrachariyar, the demon guru, was against king Mahabali donating land to Vishnu in the form of a Brahmin. He took the form of the insect and shut the tube of the jug used by the king to spill water during the donation. Vishnu identified the trick and injured the eyes of the insect with a  small spear. Sukracharyar, who lost his eyes, did penance at this place to attain the lost eye. It is the believed the light he attained is still glowing at the temple as a lamp called Nethra Deepam. Sage Parasara is believed to have worshiped the presiding deity of the temple.

Once, the architects of Devaloka, Vishvakarma and Mayan had an argument on whose skill was superior. Brahma, the god of creation informed Mayan that Vishvakarma attained betterment as he built Vaikuntha, the abode of Vishnu on account of accomplishments in a previous birth. He also informed Mayan that to attain similar status, he has to identify and build an abode near the river Kaveri similar to Vaikuntha. Mayan inspected various places and finally identified Thiruvelliyangudi, where sage Markendeya was doing penance. He built a beautiful temple and its compound, which is believed to be the temple in modern times. Vishnu appeared as Sringara Sundaran (beautiful deity).

Architecture

The temple has a three-tiered rajagopuram (gateway tower) and is enclosed within brick walls. Leaving the central shrine of the presiding deity, which is built with granite, all the other shrines are built with brick. There are separate shrines for the consort of Kolavalli Ramar, Maragathavalli. The presiding deity, Kola Valvill Ramar, is sported in Bhujanga sayan (reclined) posture. The vimana (roof over the sanctum) has Varthaga vimana pattern. There are four water bodies namely, Sukra, Brahma, Indra and Parasara that are associated with the temple.

Religious importance

The temple is counted as Vaishnava Sukra Kshetra as Vishnu appeared as a beautiful deity to please his devotee Shukra (Venus). The place derived its name Thiruvelliyangudi hence and the presiding deity is also referred to as Velliyan. It is believed that Vishnu appeared in Kalyana Kolam (marriage posture) to Parasarar, Markendeyar, Mayan, Brahma, Sukran and Bhudevi. To de-stress or relieve Vishnu, his mount or vahana, the eagle Garuda, holds the conch and the Sudarshana Chakram or disck-like wheel of Vishnu which is unique in nature, making this the only temple where Garuda is depicted in such a posture. Sage Parasarar is believed to have done penance in this temple and hence there is a temple tank called Parasara Theertham. A banana plant is seen growing from a granite base and it is believed to be historical. The temple is revered in Nalayira Divya Prabandham, the 7th–9th century Vaishnava canon, by Thirumangai Alvar in one hymn. The temple is classified as a Divya Desam, one of the 108 Vishnu temples that are mentioned in the book.

Festivals and religious practises

The temple practises Vaigasana Agama and Vadagalai tradition. The temple priests perform the pooja (rituals) during festivals and on a daily basis. As at other Vishnu temples of Tamil Nadu, the priests belong to the Vaishnavaite community, a Brahmin sub-caste. The temple rituals are performed four times a day: Kalasanthi at 8:00 a.m., Uchikalam at 12:00 p.m., Sayarakshai at 5:00 p.m., and Ardha Jamam at 7:30 p.m. Each ritual has three steps: alangaram (decoration), neivethanam (food offering) and deepa aradanai (waving of lamps) for both Kolavalvil Ramar and Maragathavalli Thayar. During the last step of worship, nagaswaram (pipe instrument) and tavil (percussion instrument) are played, religious instructions in the Vedas (sacred text) are recited by priests. There are other weekly, monthly and fortnightly rituals performed in the temple as in other Vishnu temples in South India. Vishnupathi Punniya Kalam, an auspicious time during the first days of Tamil months of Vaikasi, Avani, Karthigai and Masi is celebrated in the temple seeking divine auspices from Garuda.

See also
Divya Desams

Notes

References

External links

 
Hindu temples in Thanjavur district